Kaitlyn Black (born July 29, 1983) is an American actress known for her role as Annabeth Nass in The CW comedy-drama series Hart of Dixie.

Life and career
Black grew up in Copley, Ohio and graduated from Revere High School in Richfield, Ohio in 2001. She graduated magna cum laude from Kent State University in 2005 with a Bachelor of Arts degree in Theater.  She has been acting since the sixth grade in musical and other theater and began dancing before that in jazz, tap and ballet.

Black played a southern belle in the medical dramedy series Hart of Dixie alongside Rachel Bilson. The series debuted on The CW in September 2011.

Kaitlyn Black is now starring off-Broadway in the improv musical #DateMe: An okcupid experiment that ran for three years at Second City and other venues in Chicago.

Filmography

References

External links 
 

1983 births
Living people
Actresses from Ohio
American film actresses
American television actresses
Kent State University alumni
21st-century American actresses
Place of birth missing (living people)
People from Copley, Ohio